Sol Martinez Fainberg (born 13 November 2002) is a Spanish-Argentinian rhythmic gymnast.

Career

Junior 
Although he had opportunities to represent Spain, Sol has been a member of the Argentine team since 2015 after he appeared in the national selection in Buenos Aires that same year.
Sol competed at the 2017 Pan American Championship in Daytona Beach. She finished 7th in the all-around final, 10th with hoop, 8th with ball, 6th with clubs and 7th with ribbon.

Senior 
She debuted in senior category at the 2018 Moscow Grand Prix but she didn't advance to any final. In the same year she also competed at the World Challenge Cups in Pesaro and Guadalajara and the continental championship, but again she didn't qualify for finals. In 2019 she participated in the same stages of the World Cup and even though she did not advance to event finals Sol showed improvements.

In 2021 she took part at the World Cup in Sofia, that was part of those qualifying for the 2020 Tokyo Olympics, and the Pan American championship where she placed 4th in the team competition as well as the all-around and won silver with clubs and bronze with ribbon.

Sol started 2022 by competing at the World Cup in Sofia and then Baku getting average scores. She made history during the competition in Pamplona by qualifying for the hoop and clubs final, winning bronze with hoop being the first Argentinian gymnasts to earn a medal in the World Cup circuit.

Achievements 

 First Argentinian and South American rhythmic gymnast to win a medal in an individual apparatus final at the FIG World Challenge Cup series.

Routine music information

References

2002 births
21st-century Argentine women
Argentine rhythmic gymnasts
Competitors at the 2019 Pan American Games
Competitors at the 2022 South American Games
Living people
Gymnasts at the 2019 Pan American Games
Pan American Games competitors for Argentina
South American Games bronze medalists for Argentina
South American Games medalists in gymnastics
South American Games silver medalists for Argentina